Scotch Oakburn College is an independent, open-entry, Early Learning to Year 12, coeducational, day and boarding school in Launceston, Tasmania, in association with the Uniting Church in Australia.

Although founded in 1886, the present school was established in 1979 with the amalgamation of the historically boys' Scotch College and girls' Oakburn College (formerly the Methodist Ladies' College, based in East Launceston). The school currently caters for approximately 1,100 students from Early Learning (3 years old) to Year 12 (18 years old), including more than 70 boarders from Years 6 to 12.

Scotch Oakburn is affiliated with the Association of Heads of Independent Schools of Australia (AHISA), the Junior School Heads Association of Australia (JSHAA), the Australian Boarding Schools' Association, and the Sports Association of Tasmanian Independent Schools.

The College is a full member of the Round Square association, an international association spreading across five continents and over 100 schools around the world. Scotch Oakburn College is the first member of Round Square in Tasmania.

History

Formation 

Scotch Oakburn College was created in 1979, through the amalgamation of the Scotch College and Oakburn College (formerly the Methodist Ladies' College).

Methodist Ladies' College 

The Methodist Ladies' College, Launceston (M.L.C) was established on Elphin Road, just east of the city centre, in 1886. The aim of the college was to allow girls the same access to educational facilities as boys. The largest building on campus had been named "Oakburn" upon its construction 25 years earlier. After its first year, it had 88 students. The first Headmaster was G. Thornton-Lewis.

In 1969, M.L.C was renamed "Oakburn College" as the school council felt that 'Ladies' was outdated. The school became co–educational in 1973.

Scotch College 
The Scotch College was established as a non-denominational boys' school, on York Street in the Launceston CBD in 1901. The school went through a number of owners in its first 50 years of existence, eventually being taken over by the Presbyterian Church of Australia in October 1950. In 1917, it moved from its York Street residence to the "Ravenscraig" property on Penquite Road, Newstead, around 10 km east of the city.

By 1972 the College was struggling to survive and it was subsequently decided to introduce co–education.

Church union and amalgamation 
After the formation of the Uniting Church in Australia in 1977, representatives from both colleges joined to discuss an amalgamation. The successful amalgamation process was chaired by local physician John Morris, AO, MBE, who was then Chairman of the Oakburn College Council. 1979 was the inaugural year of Scotch Oakburn College with the Oakburn College Council Chairman becoming the Chairman of the amalgamated college's Council, and the Principal of Scotch College becoming the inaugural Principal of the amalgamated College.

The former Oakburn College campus, on Elphin Road, in 1979 became home to the Matriculation classes (years 11 and 12) and the junior school (years K–5) and boarding house. The same year, the Scotch College campus on Penquite Road became the middle school (years 6 to 10). In 1980, the current set-up was adopted with years 11 and 12 joining the middle school classes at the Penquite Campus, leaving the Elphin Campus with Early Learning to Year 5 and the boarding house.

It now operates in association with the Uniting Church in Australia but is not governed or managed by the Church.

Principals

Campuses

Elphin 
The younger of the two campuses, the Elphin Campus is the site of the more historic buildings in the school. The campus features a number of beautiful old oak trees which are located at the front of the campus in a garden area.  The Elphin Campus is home to the Junior School / primary school (Early Learning to Year 5) and boarding house. The first building on the land was "Oakburn", constructed by Eliza Thomson in 1861, a year after she was granted the land. This is the most historic building on any of the campuses. In time, "Oakburn" would become the boarding house. The college was later renamed for this building. An extension to this building, the Mary Fox Jubilee Wing, was constructed in 1935 to celebrate the College's jubilee anniversary. Today it is better known to students as the Mary Fox Hall or just the Mary Fox and it houses school assemblies, chapel services and many other events such as school plays, dances and trivia nights.

The stately "Lemana" and "The Stables" are located on the western end of the campus. "The Stables", as the name suggests, was formerly the stable area for horses. Lemana is a grand old house which keeps its historic exterior. The Mary Fox Performing Arts Centre is a dual-purpose space and is the centre of many school community events.

The Early Learning centre is home to pre-school, kindergarten, and after-hours care facilities. The centre was built on the site of the original Methodist Ladies' College/Oakburn College Principal's residence.

The Elphin campus also is home to four tennis courts, a large oval, two multi-purpose courts, a gymnasium and a 25 m swimming pool.

Penquite 
The Penquite Campus is situated on both sides of Penquite Road in Newstead, linked by an underpass.  The main side of the campus or Eastern side features a large, rectangular, grassy field in the centre, with buildings located around the outside of it.  The major buildings of the school are named after and in honor of significant people and places in the school's heritage.  Over the years these buildings have been upgraded and redeveloped and more buildings have been built. Directly inside the main entrance to the College lies a large, old oak tree which lies beside the school Chapel.
"Ravenscraig", named after the original name of the Penquite Road property, refers to the oldest classroom block on the campus.  Formerly housing senior staff and administrative offices, this area now houses learning spaces.
Briggs House is located on the eastern end of the campus.  First constructed in 1954, this building was for boarding students of Scotch College. It is named for long serving headmaster W.V.V. Briggs. Upon amalgamation, the building began to be used for social sciences classrooms, and the kitchen area became the food technology area. Today the kitchen continues to be used for classes and the remainder of the building houses staff.
The Robert Dean Senior Student Centre (formally known as the Robert Dean Centre, or just Dean Centre to students, was the campus gymnasium; it featured one multi-purpose sports court with a gym/weights area on an upstairs mezzanine floor.  The Robert Dean Centre also housed school assemblies weekly) is one of the campus' largest buildings.  Named after former Scotch College Headmaster, Robert Dean, this building was redeveloped and reopened in March 2007, as a state of the art purpose-built study centre for Year 11 and Year 12 Tasmanian Certificate of Education students, including study areas, computing laboratories, learning spaces, a fully functioning student kitchen and relaxation area. Housed beneath are the Design and Technology, and Art departments. It is visible in the centre of the campus behind the field and between the John Morris Library and Bruce Carter Administration building.
Saint Andrews, named after the patron saint of Scotland, is located on the western side of the campus. The building was refurbished internally in 2017 with the construction of the adjoining Helix building. The tuckshop is located in this area which provides a variety of healthy food options for students at both recess and lunch times.
Helix was opened in 2017 and is the Centre for Science and Mathematics and home for Years 9 and 10, on the Penquite Campus. This latest development continues the prudent investment by the College over the past decade to ensure it can provide contemporary learning spaces to complement our C21 Teaching and Learning. Helix houses four science laboratories and five new rooms.
The Health and Physical Education Centre opened in August 2007 features international standard basketball, netball, badminton and volleyball courts, two multi-purpose learning studios, and a weights and ergonomics room.

The Penquite Campus has seen a lot of building development since amalgamation:
The John Morris Centre (formerly the John Morris Library), named after the inaugural Chairman of the amalgamated College Council (now the Board of Management) was constructed in the late 1980s and refurbished in 2015.
The Bruce Carter Administration Building, named after the inaugural Principal of the amalgamated College, replaced the former administration facilities in Ravenscraig in the early 1990s.
The Horton Auditorium/Performing Arts Centre, opened in 2003, which includes an auditorium and performing arts facilities. The auditorium is named after the nineteenth century boys' school, Horton College, near Ross in the Tasmanian Midlands, which was the first Methodist College in Australia.
The Middle School, which is situated on the opposite side of Penquite Road to the main campus (next to the Heath and Physical Education Centre), opened in early 2009 and features new facilities for students in grades 6 to 8. This side of the campus is connected via a tunnel which extends to the main Penquite facilities.
Helix, the Centre for Science and Mathematics and home to Year 9 and 10 students, opened in 2017.

Valley 
In 2005, Scotch Oakburn came to an arrangement with the owner of 'Rostrevor', near Fingal, to lease and use a part the property for outdoor education and environmental study purposes. This facility is known as the Valley Campus. The Valley Campus is home to the College Education Outdoors and Sustainability program.

House system 
Scotch Oakburn College operates under four Houses: Fox (red), Dean (blue), Briggs (green) and Nance (yellow). Throughout the year, students at the middle and senior school (Penquite Campus) compete in a number of competitions to gain points to win the House Shield at the end of the year; these competitions include swimming, cross-country, athletics, debating and singing.

At the junior school (Elphin campus) – the only competitions are swimming, cross-country and athletics.

Sport 
Scotch Oakburn College is a member of the Sports Association of Tasmanian Independent Schools (SATIS).

SATIS premierships 
Scotch Oakburn College has won the following SATIS premierships.

Combined:

 Athletics (13) – 1995, 1997, 2001, 2002, 2003, 2004, 2005, 2006, 2007, 2009, 2010, 2011, 2021
 Swimming – 2021

Boys:

 Athletics (6) – 1991, 1996, 2000, 2001, 2002, 2003
 Basketball (3) – 2016, 2017, 2020
 Cricket (10) – 1929, 1930, 1931, 1936, 1968, 1970, 1974, 2013, 2015, 2016
 Cricket T20 – 2018
 Football (4) – 1967, 2005, 2018, 2019
 Hockey (2) – 1997, 1999
 Rowing (3) – 1996, 1998, 2003
 Rowing Eight (10) – 1948, 1973, 1974, 1987, 1994, 1996, 1997, 2007, 2013, 2018
 Tennis (16) – 1966, 1967, 1968, 1972, 1973, 1983, 1995, 2000, 2001, 2006, 2007, 2008, 2009, 2010, 2011, 2019

Girls:

 Athletics (7) – 1984, 1985, 2004, 2007, 2009, 2010, 2021
 Football – 2019
 Hockey (4) – 1992, 1994, 1995, 1997
 Netball (4) – 2012, 2013, 2014, 2015
 Rowing – 2005
 Rowing Eight (2) – 1997, 2021
 Softball (6) – 1988, 2010, 2011, 2012, 2013, 2014
 Swimming (4) – 1985, 1986, 1987, 2021
 Tennis (14) – 1979, 1988, 1989, 1990, 1997, 1998, 1999, 2000, 2001, 2002, 2009, 2010, 2011, 2012

Notable alumni 
Alumni of the Scotch Oakburn College (and its predecessors) are known as Old Collegians, and may elect to join the schools alumni association, the Scotch Oakburn Old Collegians Association (SOOCA). Some notable Old Collegians include:

Academic
 Alan Stretton – academic and Rhodes Scholar

Business
 Sir Edgar Coles – former Managing Director of Coles Supermarkets

Entertainment, media and the arts
 Stuart Coupe – music journalist, author, band manager, promoter, publicist, broadcaster and music label founder.
 Roger Scholes – film director

Government, politics and the law
 David Bushby – Senator for Tasmania
 Enid Campbell AO, OBE – legal scholar, first Australian female professor and law school dean
 Evelyn Temple Emmett OBE – first Director of the Tasmanian Government Tourist Bureau
 John Watson – former Senator for Tasmania
 Don Wing – former lawyer, politician and President of the Tasmanian Legislative Council

Military
 Alec Campbell – Australia's last ANZAC soldier

Sport
 Marcos Ambrose – V8 Supercar champion; NASCAR Driver
 Brent Crosswell – AFL footballer
 Michael Grenda – Olympic Cycling Gold Medalist
 Mia King – AFLW player North Melbourne
 Meg Phillips – WNCL and WBBL
cricketer

See also 
 List of schools in Tasmania
List of boarding schools
 Education in Tasmania

References 

Educational institutions established in 1979
Presbyterian schools in Australia
High schools in Tasmania
Former Methodist schools in Australia
Uniting Church schools in Australia
Boarding schools in Tasmania
Private primary schools in Tasmania
Private secondary schools in Tasmania
Rock Eisteddfod Challenge participants
Round Square schools
Junior School Heads Association of Australia Member Schools
1979 establishments in Australia